Stambolovo may refer to several villages in Bulgaria named after Stefan Stambolov:

 Stambolovo, Haskovo Province, the administrative centre of Stambolovo municipality in Haskovo Province, Bulgaria
 Stambolovo, Ruse Province, a village in Slivo Pole Municipality, Bulgaria
 Stambolovo, Sofia Province
 Stambolovo, Veliko Tarnovo Province